Trifon Datsinski (born 2 February 1953) is a Bulgarian equestrian. He competed in two events at the 1980 Summer Olympics.

References

External links
 

1953 births
Living people
Bulgarian male equestrians
Olympic equestrians of Bulgaria
Equestrians at the 1980 Summer Olympics
Place of birth missing (living people)
20th-century Bulgarian people